Everett "Ev" Kjelbertson (February 20, 1935 – November 3, 2018) was an American football and baseball coach. He served as the head football coach at North Dakota State University from 1973 to 1975, compiling a record of 17–13. Prior to serving as head coach, Kjelbertson served as an assistant with the Bison from 1964 to 1972 and as head football coach of LaMoure High School from 1958 to 1963, where he tallied a mark of 37–9–1. Kjelbertson resigned as head coach at North Dakota State at the conclusion of their 1975 season. He played college football at Jamestown College, from which he graduated in 1958.

Head coaching record

College football

References

1935 births
2018 deaths
Jamestown Jimmies football players
North Dakota State Bison baseball coaches
North Dakota State Bison football coaches
High school football coaches in North Dakota
People from Devils Lake, North Dakota
Coaches of American football from North Dakota
Baseball coaches from North Dakota